Des Moines River Bridge may refer to:

Des Moines River Bridge (Humboldt, Iowa), listed on the National Register of Historic Places in Humboldt County, Iowa
Des Moines River Bridge (Swea City, Iowa), listed on the National Register of Historic Places in Kossuth County, Iowa